Pristiosomus is an extinct genus of prehistoric bony fish. It was discovered and named by Priem in 1924. Pristiosomus lived in the Triassic Period. Like other similar fish, it had thick layers of bony scales, which probably helped protect it from predation by other fish and nothosaurs.

Taxonomy
There is one known species, Pristiosomus merlei. It has been classified in both the Semionotiformes and the Pholidopleuroformes at different times. It was placed in the Pholidopleuroformes due to its similarity to Australosomus merlei (Piveteau).

Etymology
Pristiosomus comes from the Latin 'pristis' meaning 'sea monster' or 'shark' and the Greek 'soma' meaning 'body'. merlei refers to a person after whom it was named.

See also

 Prehistoric fish
 List of prehistoric bony fish

References

Prehistoric bony fish genera